The Trouble Hunter is a 1920 American silent comedy film featuring Oliver Hardy.

Cast
 Jimmy Aubrey as A social error
 Evelyn Nelson as The Salvation Army lassie
 Oliver Hardy as The Bouncer (as Babe Hardy)
 Kathleen Myers as His sister

See also
 List of American films of 1920
 Oliver Hardy filmography

External links

1920 films
1920 comedy films
1920 short films
American silent short films
American black-and-white films
Films directed by Jess Robbins
Silent American comedy films
American comedy short films
1920s American films